Shchastia Raion is a raion (district) of Luhansk Oblast, Ukraine. It was created in July 2020 as part of the reform of administrative divisions of Ukraine. The center of the raion is the urban-type settlement of Novoaidar. Population: 

Following the 2022 Russian invasion of Ukraine, the entire region is now under Russian control, as part of the Luhansk People's Republic.

References

Raions of Luhansk Oblast
Ukrainian raions established during the 2020 administrative reform